Raphaël Astier (born 10 December 1976 in Alès, Gard) is a modern pentathlete from France. He competed at the 2004 Summer Olympics in Athens, where he finished twenty-fifth in the men's event, with a score of 4,932 points.

Astier achieved his best results in 2003 and in 2005, when he won the gold medal at the Open Asian Modern Pentathlon Championships in Kaohsiung, Taiwan, and at the Bath International Meeting in Bath, England, respectively.

References

External links
  (archived page from Pentathlon.org)

1976 births
Living people
French male modern pentathletes
Olympic modern pentathletes of France
Modern pentathletes at the 2004 Summer Olympics
21st-century French people